The Ireland women's cricket team represents Ireland in international women's cricket. Cricket in Ireland is governed by Cricket Ireland and organised on an All-Ireland basis, meaning the Irish women's team represents both Northern Ireland and the Republic of Ireland.

Ireland made its One-Day International (ODI) debut in 1987, against Australia, and the following year played at the 1988 World Cup, making the first of five appearances at the tournament. Throughout the 1990s and early 2000s Ireland was considered to be a top-level team, playing regular ODI series and placing as high as fifth at the World Cup (in 1993, out of eight teams). In 2000, the team played its only Test match, defeating Pakistan. Although it still retains ODI status, Ireland has not qualified for a World Cup since the 2005 event. The team has, however, qualified for the ICC World Twenty20 on two occasions, in 2014 and 2016. In December 2018, Cricket Ireland offered professional contracts to the women players for the first time.

In April 2021, the ICC awarded permanent Test and One Day International (ODI) status to all full member women's teams.

History

1980s

The Irish women's team entered the international arena well before their male counterparts, playing their first ODIs in a three match series against Australia in 1987, a full 19 years before the men's team would make their ODI debut. They lost all three games by more than 100 runs, but were still invited to take part in the World Cup the following year in Australia.

In that World Cup, they finished fourth, losing to New Zealand in the third place play-off game. Ireland subsequently came fourth of five in the tournament, with Ireland's only two wins both came against The Netherlands. The next year, Ireland took part in the first Women's European Championship in Denmark, finishing fourth on run rate, with their only win coming against the hosts.

1990s

The first two years of the 1990s again saw Ireland compete in the European Championships, finishing as runners up to England in 1990, and third place in 1991. Sandwiched between those two tournaments was a 2 match ODI series against England, with England winning both games, the second by 10 wickets.

1993 saw them compete in the World Cup again, this time finishing in fifth place. The next European Championship in 1995 again saw them finish as runners up to England. Following this, they settled into a pattern of playing ODIs against whichever team was touring England, a pattern that continues to this day. The 1997 World Cup saw them lose to New Zealand in the quarter finals. The end of the 1990s saw them again finish as runners up to England in the European Championship in 1999.

2000s

Ireland played their first ever Test match in 2000, beating Pakistan by an innings inside two days in Dublin. This is still their only Test match however. They also dominated the ODI series against Pakistan, winning 4–0 with a fifth game rained off. They still could only finish seventh in the World Cup later that year though, their only win coming against The Netherlands. The following year, they won the European Championship, and that remains the only time out of seven tournaments that the England team had not won the competition.

That seventh place meant that they had to take part in the 2003 IWCC Trophy, the inaugural edition of what is now known simply as the World Cup Qualifier. They won every game in that tournament, which qualified them for the world cup in South Africa in 2005. They came last in that tournament, meaning they will have to qualify again for the 2009 World Cup. Later in the year, they yet again finished as runners up to England in the European Championship.

They played a two match ODI series against the Netherlands, winning both games. In November 2007, they went to the Women's World Cup Qualifier in Lahore, where they played Bermuda, The Netherlands, Pakistan, Papua New Guinea, Scotland, South Africa and an African qualifier.

In 2009, Ireland beat the Netherlands to win the European Championship.

In April 2016, Laura Delany was named as captain of Ireland women's cricket team replacing Isobel Joyce who stepped down after the 2016 ICC Women's World Twenty20 in India.

In December 2020, the ICC announced the qualification pathway for the 2023 ICC Women's T20 World Cup. Ireland were named in the 2021 ICC Women's T20 World Cup Europe Qualifier regional group, alongside five other teams.

In 2021, Ireland were awarded qualification for the 2022–25 ICC Women's Championship on the basis of their WODI ranking after the abandonment of the 2021 Women's Cricket World Cup Qualifier.

Tournament history

Women's Cricket World Cup 

 1988: 4th
 1993: 5th
 1997: Quarter finals
 2000: 7th
 2005: 8th

Women's Cricket World Cup Qualifier 

 2003: 1st (Qualify)
 2008: 3rd 
 2011: 6th
 2017: 6th
 2021: Cancelled

ICC Women's T20 World Cup
 2014: 10th
 2016: 10th
 2018: 10th
 2023: 10th

ICC Women's World Twenty20 Qualifier
 2013: 3rd (DNQ)
 2015: Qualify
 2018: Qualify
 2019: 3rd (DNQ)
 2022: 2nd (Q)

European Championship 
1989: 4th place
1990: Runners-up
1991: 3rd place
1995: Runners-up
1999: Runners-up
2001: Winners
2005: Runners-up
2009: Winners

Squad
This lists all the players with a central contract with Cricket Ireland or were named in the most recent ODI or T20I squad. Updated as of 6 September 2022.

Records
International match summary – Ireland Women 
 
Last updated 20 February 2023.

Test matches
Highest team total: 193/3 declared v. Pakistan on 30 July 2000 at Trinity College Park, Dublin. 
Highest individual score: 68*, Caitriona Beggs v. Pakistan on 30 July 2000 at Trinity College Park, Dublin.
Best innings bowling: 6/21, Isobel Joyce v. Pakistan on 30 July 2000 at Trinity College Park, Dublin. 

Test record versus other nations

Records complete to Women's Test #111. Last updated 30 July 2000.

One-Day Internationals
Highest team total: 337/8 v. Netherlands on 24 August 2022 at VRA Cricket Ground, Amstelveen.
Highest individual score: 137, Leah Paul v. Netherlands on 24 August 2022 at VRA Cricket Ground, Amstelveen.
Best innings bowling: 5/13, Eimear Richardson v. Netherlands on 5 August 2009 at The Vineyard, Dublin. 

 

Most ODI runs for Ireland Women

Most ODI wickets for Ireland Women

Highest individual innings in Women's ODI

Best bowling figures in an innings in Women's ODI

ODI record versus other nations

Records complete to WODI #1298. Last updated 9 November 2022.

Twenty20 Internationals

Highest team total: 213/4, v Netherlands on 12 August 2019 at Sportpark Het Schootsveld, Deventer. 
Highest individual innings: 105*, Gaby Lewis v Germany on 26 August 2021 at La Manga Club, Cartagena. 
Best innings bowling: 4/15, Ciara Metcalfe v Sri Lanka on 20 March 2016  at Punjab Cricket Association IS Bindra Stadium, Mohali. 

Most WT20I runs for Ireland Women

Most WT20I wickets for Ireland Women

WT20I record versus other nations

Records complete to WT20I #1373. Last updated 20 February 2023.

See also
Irish men's cricket team
List of Ireland women Test cricketers
List of Ireland women ODI cricketers
List of Ireland women Twenty20 International cricketers

References

Further reading

  
Women's national cricket teams
Women's cricket in Ireland
1987 establishments in Ireland